Portet-Saint-Simon is a railway station in Portet-sur-Garonne, Occitanie, France. The station is on the Toulouse-Bayonne railway and Portet-Saint-Simon–Puigcerdà railway. The station is served by TER (local) services operated by the SNCF.

Train services
The following services currently call at Portet-Saint-Simon:
local service (TER Occitanie) Toulouse–Foix–Latour-de-Carol-Enveitg
local service (TER Occitanie) Toulouse–Saint-Gaudens–Tarbes–Pau

References

Railway stations in France opened in 1861
Railway stations in Haute-Garonne